Pseudomiza obliquaria is a species of moth of the family Geometridae first described by John Henry Leech in 1897. It is found in Taiwan, China and Bhutan.

The wingspan is 38–40 mm.

References

Moths described in 1897
Ennominae